Cecil Brownlow Twisleton Wykeham Fiennes (20 August 1831 – 13 March 1870) was an English first-class cricketer and clergyman.

The son of Frederick Fiennes and his wife, Emily Wingfield, he was born in August 1831 at Adlestrop, Gloucestershire. He was educated at Winchester College, before matriculating at New College, Oxford in 1852, graduating B.A. and M.A. in 1859. He made his debut in first-class cricket for the Gentlemen of England against the Gentlemen of Kent and Surrey at Canterbury in 1855. He played first-class cricket until 1859, making six appearances for the Gentlemen of England and three appearances for the Marylebone Cricket Club. He scored 72 runs in his nine first-class appearances, in addition to taking 7 wickets with best figures of 4 for 26. After graduating from Oxford, he became an Anglican clergyman and was the rector of Hamstall Ridware in Staffordshire. He was the rector of Ashow in Warwickshire from 1866 until his death at Torquay in March 1870. His brother, Wingfield, was also a first-class cricketer.

References

External links

1831 births
1870 deaths
People from Cotswold District
People educated at Winchester College
Alumni of New College, Oxford
English cricketers
Gentlemen of England cricketers
Marylebone Cricket Club cricketers
19th-century English Anglican priests
Cecil
Younger sons of barons